Augustin de Backer (18 July 1809 in Antwerp, Belgium – 1 December 1873 in Liège, Belgium) was a Belgian Jesuit and renowned bibliographer.

Early years and Formation
De Backer left his country to be educated at the Jesuit schools of France (Beauregard, Saint-Acheul) and Switzerland Fribourg. After schooling, and rather than going to the university, he undertook to visit libraries of France and Belgium in search of books printed by Plantin. In 1835, he was received into the Society of Jesus (in Rome) by the Superior General, Father John-Baptist Roothaan, who sent him back to Nivelles, in Belgium, for his novitiate (29 June 1835). He taught three years in the school of Namur (1837-1840), and in 1840, began his studies for the priesthood in Leuven. Ordained priest on 10 September 1843.

Bibliographer
While at Louvain, he came across the Bibliotheca Scriptorum Societatis Jesu published in 1676 by Nathaniel Bacon, and he resolved to revise and update the bibliography of Bacon with the help of scientific methods unavailable at the time of Nathaniel Bacon. Based in Liège he visited Belgian and foreign libraries and, with the help of his natural brother Alois de Backer (also, coincidentally, a Jesuit), started publishing, from 1853 on, his magnum opus: La bibliothèque des écrivains de la Compagnie de Jésus. For each Jesuit author a short biographical note was given, along with the list of all his writings in their successive editions. The first edition was 7 volumes (printed from 1853 to 1861). Carlos Sommervogel (1834-1902)'s Bibliothèque de la Compagnie de Jésus remains the standard reference book for research into Jesuit writings till the end of the 19th century.

Main work
 Bibliothèque des écrivains de la Compagnie de Jésus, 7 vol., Liège, 1853–1861.

References

Bibliography
 Van Tricht, V.: La bibliothèque des écrivains de la Compagnie de Jésus et le Père Augustin de Backer, Louvain, 1876.

1809 births
1873 deaths
19th-century Belgian Jesuits
Clergy from Antwerp
Belgian bibliographers